Daniel Boone Native Gardens, located in Boone, North Carolina, United States, has a collection of North Carolina native plants in an informal landscaped design. The gardens are open daily from May to October.

History
The gardens were planned as a laboratory so that clubs, schools and botanists could study plants within a small area. The Garden Club of North Carolina broke ground in May 1961 on land adjacent to the outdoor theater where Horn in the West is performed. The Asheville landscape architect Doan Ogden designed the layout of the gardens. The gardens officially opened to the public in 1966.

Features
The wrought iron gates at the entrance were given by Daniel Boone VI, a descendant of famed American frontiersman Daniel Boone. Its main features include a bog garden, stone gatehouse, rockery, grassed allée, wishing well, reflection pool, prayer shrine, rustic bridge and Squire Boone Cabin. Squire Boone Cabin is typical of the cabin in which Daniel Boone lived. The logs are from the cabin of Jesse Boone, Daniel's brother, where Daniel spent much time. The newest addition to the garden, the bog, was dedicated in June 1992.

Plants on display

Large trees
 Acer spicatum (mountain maple)
 Acer saccharum (sugar maple)
 Acer rubrum (red maple)
 Acer pensylvanicum (striped maple)
 Fagus grandifolia (beech)
 Sassafras
 Sycamore
 Fraxinus pennsylvanica (green ash)
 Persimmon
 Magnolia acuminata
 Magnolia fraseri
 Magnolia tripetala
 Magnolia macrophylla
 Mulberry
 Liriodendron tulipifera (yellow poplar)
 Golden weeping willow
 Juglans cinerea (butternut)
 Hickory
 Slippery elm
 Nyssa sylvatica (black gum)
 Black walnut
 White paper birch
 Betula nigra (river birch)
 Betula lutea (yellow birch)
 Betula lenta (cherry birch)
 Dogwood
 Redbud
 Chionanthus (fringe tree)
 Sweet crab
 Sourwoods
 Pussy willow
 Amelanchier (shadblow)
 Sorbus aucuparia (mountain ash, rowan)
 Franklinia
 Halesia carolina (silver bell)

Conifers
 Thuja occidentalis
 Juniperus virginiana
 Carolina hemlocks
 Canadian hemlocks
 Red spruce
 Fraser fir
 Balsam fir
 white pine
 Shortleaf pine
 Scrub pine

Shrubs
 Rhododendron maximum
 Rhododendron catawbiense
 Rhododendron carolinianum
 Rhododendron minus
 Kalmia latifolia (mountain laurel)
 Pieris floribunda
 Leucothoe catesbeii
 Azalea Rosea
 Azalea Vaseyi
 Azalea Viscosa
 Azalea Arborescens
 Azalea Calendulacea (flame)

Flowers and vines
 12 types of native vines
 Shade, evergreen, rockgarden and bog wildflowers
 Ferns and mosses

See also 
 Daniel Boone Arboretum (Harrogate, Tennessee)
 List of botanical gardens in the United States

References

External links
 Daniel Boone Native Gardens

Botanical gardens in North Carolina
Arboreta in North Carolina
Protected areas of Watauga County, North Carolina
Boone, North Carolina